The A Head Full of Dreams Tour was the seventh concert tour undertaken by British rock band Coldplay. It was announced on 27 November 2015 in support of their seventh studio album, A Head Full of Dreams, and marked a return to live performing at stadiums following the intimate shows from Ghost Stories Tour (2014), which saw the band playing in venues such as the Beacon Theatre and Royal Albert Hall. With exception of "Fun" and hidden track "X Marks the Spot", all songs from the album were played. The band combined extensive use of laser light and pyrotechnic special effects with raw, acoustic segments between stages, complementing performances with a new version of the Xylobands from Mylo Xyloto Tour (2011–12). 

The concert run consisted of 122 shows in eight legs across five continents, starting at Argentina's Estadio Ciudad de La Plata on 31 March 2016 and finishing at the same venue on 15 November 2017. It also marked their first solo shows in Latin America since Viva la Vida Tour (2009–10). According to Billboard, Coldplay grossed $523 million from 5.38 million tickets sold in 114 dates, making A Head Full of Dreams Tour the third-highest-grossing tour of all time upon conclusion. In 2018, Live in Buenos Aires was released to celebrate the concert run and promoted along with The Butterfly Package, a set which additionally contained Live in São Paulo and Coldplay: A Head Full of Dreams. The latter is a career-spanning documentary directed by Mat Whitecross.

Development

Background
Following the release of Coldplay's sixth album, Ghost Stories (2014), the band announced they would not be making an usual tour for it, limiting themselves to one-off concerts at smaller venues around the world. On 6 November 2015, "Adventure of a Lifetime" was made available as the lead single for A Head Full of Dreams. The song was succeeded by the tour announcement on 27 November, which included numerous stadium dates spread across 14 countries in Europe and Latin America for the next year. During an interview for The Late Late Show with James Corden, the band mentioned they would also be visiting Asia and North America. In April 2016, Coldplay announced 12 new arena shows in the United States. Months later, they published teasers on social media with dates for Singapore, Philippines, Taiwan, South Korea, and Japan. In 2017, the band further promoted the tour's namesake album by releasing a companion piece named Kaleidoscope EP, which included four new songs and a live version of "Something Just Like This".

Promotion
Before starting the tour, Coldplay performed the Super Bowl 50 halftime show, which included guest appearances from Beyoncé, Bruno Mars, Mark Ronson and the Youth Orchestra Los Angeles, earning the biggest audience in history for a group and male act performing at the event as well. The band later appeared in multiple festivals, including the BBC Radio 1's Big Weekend in Exeter. Lead singer Chris Martin said he lived "the first few years of my life less than 500 yards from where we'll be performing so this couldn't be more of a homecoming for me". In 2016, they were announced as headliners for Glastonbury Festival, setting the record for most headlining sets ever by any act. Months later, the band appeared at Global Citizen Festival in Mumbai, where they played "Maa Tujhe Salaam" with A. R. Rahman. Martin has been the event's curator since 2015 and plans to fulfil the role for the next 15 years. He invited Colombian singer Shakira for the Hamburg edition. In 2017, Coldplay were part of the iHeartRadio Music Festival.

Opening acts

Most of the tour included two supporting acts on each concert, with British singer Lianne La Havas opening all performances held during the first Latin American and European legs, marking the first stadium shows of her career. She noted being a fan of Coldplay for many years and grew up listening to them. Canadian singer Alessia Cara supported the first European and North American runs as well, which additionally included Foxes and Birdy. In select dates, local artists from their respective country were invited to serve as opening acts: Ximena Sariñana and Hana Ciliberti performed in the Mexico City shows, while Radwimps played at the Tokyo Dome on 9 April 2016. Remaining dates for the Asian leg were supported by Jess Kent, who also participated in the concerts held in Australia and New Zealand. 

For their second run in Europe, Coldplay included AlunaGeorge and Swedish singer Tove Lo, with whom they collaborated on the song "Fun", from A Head Full of Dreams (2015). The local acts invited for Hannover, Gothenburg and Cardiff were German singer Femme Schmidt, Danish group Mew and English band Embrace, respectively. Meanwhile, the second leg in North America featured singers Izzy Bizu and Alina Baraz. In November 2017, Coldplay finished the tour with shows in Brazil and Argentina, which were opened by Jon Hopkins and Dua Lipa. The former has been a collaborator of the band since their fourth album, Viva la Vida or Death and All His Friends (2008), while Martin co-wrote the song "Homesick" for the latter's debut album. After being asked about the experience, she commented it was "amazing" and "surreal to get to sit next to him on the piano and hear him perform so close to me" and thanked the singer for the opportunity, adding she learned a lot from him when they were on studio.

Concert synopsis

Similar to Mylo Xyloto Tour (2011–12), the band combined performances including laser light and pyrotechnic visuals at the main stage with intimate sets at the B-stage and C-stage. During the latter segment, songs were played strictly in acoustic renditions. Shows usually featured between 22 and 25 tracks, which sometimes incorporated new intros and outros: "Paradise" started regularly but ended in its Tiësto remix version, while "Fix You" was performed with an additional instrumental background from "Midnight". Before the tour began, Martin said Coldplay would "finally have a set list where we feel good about it from start to finish". He joked about being "at the point in our career where we can get through a concert without playing anything shit" as well.

Aside from their own catalogue, the band often covered songs from other artists, most notably "Heroes" by David Bowie during the first four legs of the tour. According to Martin, they were good friends with Bowie, though he rejected a collaboration for "Lhuna", a charity single released with Australian singer Kylie Minogue in 2008, claiming the track was "not one of your best". The band also performed Johnny Cash's "Ring of Fire" in selected shows. Coldplay originally wrote "Til Kingdom Come" as a collaboration with the singer, but he died before being able to record it. Additionally, the band had a "Fan Dedication Song" segment at the C-stage: "We'd ask people to give us a reason why they want us to play that song so there is a purpose behind why we play it".

Reception

Commercial performance
Fans who pre-ordered A Head Full of Dreams (2015) from Amazon were given early access to buy tickets for the United Kingdom shows on 26 November 2015, with general sales for the entire first European leg being opened in the following day. Due to high demand, Coldplay announced new dates in Mexico City, Barcelona, Manchester, Zurich, London, Amsterdam and Copenhagen. Over 900,000 people attempted to buy tickets for the concerts in Seoul, leading online servers to crash. The band's 17 April 2016 performance at Foro Sol earned the venue's biggest ever single-day attendance (67,451 tickets), a record also broken at Bangkok's Rajamangala Stadium (62,068 tickets). Additionally, they registered the highest-grossing show of Singapore's history ($12.4 million). In Taiwan, the band achieved the biggest ticket sales of all time for an international act, a record broken by Blackpink in 2023. The concerts in London and Paris were the most prolific of their career in both attendance and gross according to Pollstar. After the last show in La Plata, Billboard reported the A Head Full of Dreams Tour was the third-highest-grossing tour of all time, earning $523,033,675 from 5,389,586 tickets sold in 114 dates.

Critical reception
The tour was met with generally positive reviews from music critics, with Ludovic Hunter-Tilney from the Financial Times describing it as a "bubble of positivity making its way around a turbulent world". He stated large venues were a "natural home" for Coldplay and where their "uplifting platitudes make most sense". Writing for The Sydney Morning Herald, Bernard Zuel commented the concert was "very big, but just on the right side of huge. They get loud and in your face but never up your nose. They grab for audience participation but collegially rather than greedily", praising how they crafted a "continuously satisfying pop show that has elements of U2 and Taylor Swift, Springsteen and Kylie, but somehow retains a sliver of modesty". In his five-star Wembley Stadium review for the Evening Standard, David Smyth stated Coldplay were "playing more stadium shows in London than anyone else this summer because no one else is doing this kind of thing better. Long may they shine". Similarly, The Guardian Kitty Empire rated their Croke Park performance with 4/5 stars and mentioned it felt "like the encore, the kind that sends you out into the night streets, hollering the chorus" even when the band were "just two songs in".

Accolades

Live album 

After the tour was finished, Coldplay released Live in Buenos Aires (2018), their fifth live album. It consisted of two CDs with songs played during their last show in La Plata. The record was marketed along with The Butterfly Package, a set which additionally contained Live in São Paulo, their first music film to include a concert in full, and Coldplay: A Head Full of Dreams, a documentary featuring previously unseen behind-the-scenes footage. A one-night-only premiere for the latter was held at selected cinemas across the world one month earlier, grossing $3.5 million from over 300,000 tickets sold and reaching number one at the box office of Netherlands; number two in Australia, Italy and United Kingdom; and number five in the United States. Both projects were directed by Mat Whitecross, a long-time collaborator of the band. Sam Sodomsky from Pitchfork stated Live in Buenos Aires made "a strong case for the legacy of one of the 21st century's most enduring live acts", while Live in São Paulo was nominated for a UK Music Video Award.

Set list
This set list was taken from the band's 7 November 2017 concert in São Paulo, Brazil. It does not represent all shows throughout the tour.

Main stage
"O Mio Babbino Caro" 
"A Head Full of Dreams" 
"Yellow"
"Every Teardrop Is a Waterfall"
"The Scientist"
"God Put a Smile Upon Your Face" 
"Paradise" 

B-stage
"Always in My Head"
"Magic"
"Everglow"

Main stage
"Clocks" 
"Midnight" 
"Charlie Brown"
"Hymn for the Weekend"
"Fix You" 
"Viva la Vida"
"Adventure of a Lifetime"

C-stage
"Colour Spectrum" 
"Us Against the World"
"In My Place"
"Til Kingdom Come"

Main stage
"Life Is Beautiful"
"Something Just Like This"
"A Sky Full of Stars"
"Up&Up"

Tour dates

Cancelled shows

Personnel
Credits taken from the band's official tour book, which was sold exclusively on merchandise booths and their online store.

Performing members
 Chris Martin – lead vocals, piano, rhythm guitar
 Jonny Buckland – lead guitar, backing vocals, keyboards
 Guy Berryman – bass, backing vocals, keyboards, percussion
 Will Champion – drums, backing vocals, percussion

Main crew
 Dave Holmes – manager
 Phil Harvey – creative director
 Arlene Moon – management
 Mandi Frost – management
 Marguerite Nguyen – tour manager
 Bill Leabody – tour production manager
 Craig Finley – stage production manager
 Nicole Erin Massey – production coordinator
 Misty Buckley – production designer
 Paul Normandale – production designer
 Andy Frost – road manager and head of security
 Kim-Maree Penn – security
 Jessie Collins – band assistant
 Ej Randall – band assistant
 Dan Green – audio director
 Rik Simpson – broadcast engineer
 Matt Miller – pro tools director
 Tiffany Henry – dressing rooms and wardrobe
 Megumi Kusano – Dave Holmes assistant
 Roxy Pope – management assistant
 Tiffany Hudson – band tour assistant
 Dan Portanier – trainer
 Carys Moggridge – physiotherapist
 Jeff Mauss – tour accountant
 Dick Massey – utilities
 David White – venue security

Backline
 Matt McGinn – guitar tech
 Craig Hope – guitar tech
 Sean Buttery – drum tech 
 Paul Newman – bass tech
 Andy Henderson – keyboards tech and digital tech
 Bill Rahko – pro tools tech
 Leonel Neto da Rocha – piano tech

Audio
 Chris Wood – monitor engineer
 Tony Smith – FoH tech
 Nick Davis – monitor tech
 Ali Viles – RF tech
 Nick Mooney – audio crew chief

Audio crew
 Jack Murphy
 Brett Taylor
 Alex Fedrizzi
 Tyler Clapp
 Damian Burns
 Peter Smith
 Adam Banister

Lighting
 Graham Feast – lighting director
 Mick Stowe – lighting crew chief

Lighting crew
 Phil Sharp
 Rick Butler
 Gareth Horridge
 Paul Burke
 Adam Morrison
 Colleen Wittenberg
 Kenny Rutkowski
 Tony Quinn
 Pip Schulte
 Matt Helmick

Video
 Ben Miles – video director
 Phil Johnston – video crew chief
 Oli Derynck – video engineer
 Leo Flint – video programmer

Video crew
 Pieter Laleman
 Saria Ofogba
 Chris Farrants
 Ed Prescott
 Graham Lambkin
 Marcus Wareham
 Jeroen Mahieu
 Mark Cruikshank
 Niall Ogilvy
 Michael Cordier
 Hamanshu Patel

Video content produced by
 Ben Miles
 NorthHouse Films
 Shop
 Hello Charlie
 Marcus Haney
 Mat Whitecross

Special effects
 David Kennedy – laser and pyro designer
 Reid Nofsinger – pyro designer and lead SFX

Special effects crew
 Scott Allen
 Alan Grant
 Brook Blomquist
 Jeremy Fox
 Justin Seedle
 Mike Hartle
 Joey Atkinson
 Jeff Jowdy

Rigging crew
 Russel Glen (head rigger)
 Bjorn Melchert
 Matt Rynes
 Jerry Ritter

Carpenter crew
 Jack Deitering (head carpenter)
 Pat Boyd
 Shawn Saucier
 Dale Bryant
 Andrew Pearson
 Lennie Watson
 Jeroen Padberg
 Ryan Floyd

Wristbands
 Jason Regler – tech
 Antony Burry – tech
 Arman Chaparyan – coordinator

Set design assistants
 Richard Olivieri
 Laura Woodroffe

Site coordinators
 Toby Fleming
 Bart Durbin

Lead electrician
 Paul Traynor

Barricade
 Paul Lincoln
 Chris Kordek

Drapes
 Steve Capaldi
 Daniel Roquero Lopez
 Tom Drury

Catering crew
 Susan Power (chief)
 James Morries
 Brendan McKenzie
 Daniel Gamble
 Hannah West
 Sarah Money
 Lulu Foster-Young
 Cherry Pashby
 Alicia Boardman
 Alison Higgins
 Pauline Austin
 Sally Cureton
 Molly Gallagher

Bus drivers
 Sven Schendel
 Jan Sven Berse
 Joachim Wolfram
 Matthias Gerstmann
 Scott Pickering
 Helli Windisch
 Uwe Scholz
 Chris Templar
 Paul Kakasiouris

Truck drivers
 David Ballantyne (chief)
 Mark Coleman (chief)
 Roger Bungay
 Andrew Mellor
 Robbie Jones
 Mel Bentley
 Tristen Bond
 Grant Sharkey
 Jimmy Greives
 Leon Creswick
 Mike Osbourne
 Paul Chapman
 John Stanmore
 Ian Greenwood
 Jason Smith
 Mark Schubert
 Mike Williams
 Steve Dunne
 Jon Baldwin
 Dave Hayhurst
 Albert Golon
 Dougie Miller
 Mark Cameron

Tour book
 Pilar Zeta – artwork and tour book design
 Chris Salmon – digital director and tour book interviews
 Debs Wild – web ambassador

Management
 Marty Diamond – North America booking agent
 Larry Webman – North America booking agent
 Steve Strange – ROW booking agent
 Josh Javor – ROW booking agent
 Gavin Maude – legal
 Ryan Vince – legal
 Lester Dales – business management
 Paul Makin – business management
 David Weise – US business management

Photography by
 Matt Benton
 Marcus Haney
 Phil Harvey
 Pilar Zeta
 Ollie Smallwood
 Ultramajic
 Chris Salmon
 Marguerite Nguyen
 Julia Kennedy
 Matt Miller
 Mariana Miranda Pedroza da Silva
 Irwing Heinz

Others
 Ken Macalpine – merchandise
 Anna Roguski – Oxfam representative
 Phoebe Baldwin – Global Citizen representative
 Hannah Riley – Innocence Project representative

Gear
Credits taken from Projection, Lights & Staging News, with product quantities being represented between parenthesis whenever possible.

 HES Whole Hog 4 Consoles (2)
 Martin MAC Vipers (16)
 Martin MAC Viper AirFX (18)
 Martin MAC Axioms (12)
 Vari*Lite VL3500 FX (18)
 Martin MAC Auras (45)
 Martin MAC Quantum Washes (14)
 Clay Paky Sharpys (74)
 Ayrton MagicDot-Rs (52)
 Color Kinetics iW Blasts (18)
 LadLED RGBW Washes (62)
 LadLED DWE Washes (16)
 4-lite Linear Mole Feys (64)
 8-lite Mole Feys (8)
 Solaris Flares (29)
 Prolights Lumipix Battens (12)
 Novalite Super Novas (6)
 Prolights StudioCOB UV (49)
 4K Robert Juliat Spots (6)
 1.8K Truss Spots (8)
 DF-50 Hazers (4)
 Kinesys Motors (6)
 Custom Torm Racks (62)
 85' HUD Truss 
 165' Tomcat 20" Box Truss

See also
 List of Coldplay live performances
 List of highest-grossing concert tours
 List of highest-grossing live music artists

Notes

References

External links

Coldplay Official Website

2016 concert tours
2017 concert tours
Coldplay concert tours
Concert tours of Asia
Concert tours of Australia
Concert tours of Austria
Concert tours of Belgium
Concert tours of Canada
Concert tours of Denmark
Concert tours of Europe
Concert tours of France
Concert tours of Germany
Concert tours of Ireland
Concert tours of Italy
Concert tours of Japan
Concert tours of Mexico
Concert tours of New Zealand
Concert tours of North America
Concert tours of Oceania
Concert tours of Singapore
Concert tours of South America
Concert tours of South Korea
Concert tours of Spain
Concert tours of Sweden
Concert tours of Switzerland
Concert tours of Taiwan
Concert tours of Thailand
Concert tours of the Netherlands
Concert tours of the United Kingdom
Concert tours of the United States